Carlo Grande (born 3 July 1974 in Syracuse, Sicily) is an Italian rower.

References 
 

1974 births
Living people
Italian male rowers
People from Syracuse, Sicily
World Rowing Championships medalists for Italy
Sportspeople from the Province of Syracuse